Ikechukwu Mitchel Ogbonna, professionally known as IK Ogbonna, is a Nigerian film and television actor, model, director, and television personality. He was in the movie Playing Safe alongside Tonto Dikeh and Ini Edo.

Career 
Ogbonna took part in the audition for the Amstel Malta Box Office television show in 2005 and was picked. He has been a model for quite a long time.

Filmography 

 Ghana Must Go (2016)
 Hire a Man (2017) 
 Pebbles of Love (2017)
 Excess Luggage (2017)
 Disguise (2018)
 The Washerman (2018) 
 SHOWBIZ (2019) 
 Unroyal (2020)
 Soft Work (2020)
 Christmas in Miami (2021)
 I am Nazzy

Awards and nominations

See also
 List of Nigerian actors
 List of Nigerian film directors

References 

Living people
21st-century Nigerian male actors
Nigerian male models
Year of birth missing (living people)
Nigerian male television actors
Igbo actors
Nigerian television personalities
Nigerian film directors
Nigerian male film actors
Nigerian media personalities